Pennyrile may refer to any of the following:
 the pennyroyal, or European pennyroyal, Mentha pulegium
the false or American pennyroyal, Hedeoma pulegioides
 most commonly, the geographic area of Kentucky named for the plant, and otherwise known as the Pennyroyal Plateau.
 the Pennyrile Parkway, a Kentucky highway, formerly a toll road, that traverses parts of the plateau and the state's adjacent Western Coal Fields.

Kentucky culture